Deltoplastis ovatella is a moth in the family Lecithoceridae. It is endemic to Taiwan.

Description
The wingspan is 15–17 mm. The forewings are relatively narrow with a small, elongated costal patch before the middle. The hindwings are pale grey and broader than the forewings.

Etymology 
The name is derived from the oval-shaped median fascia on the forewings.

References

Deltoplastis
Moths of Taiwan
Endemic fauna of Taiwan
Moths described in 2001